Ibrahim Safi (1898–1983) was an Azerbaijani painter. He was born in Nakhchivan, Azerbaijan. His surname is taken from the famous Turkish tribe of Safi which played an important role in organizing the Safavid dynasty at the beginning of the 16th century. He graduated from the Moscow Fine Arts Academy. During the First World War, he moved to Istanbul and became a Turkish citizen. He graduated from the Sanayi-i Nefise Mektebi (School of Fine Arts) in 1923. He is well known as an impressionist/realist.

References

External links

Baktabul: A selection of paintings by Safi 

1898 births
1983 deaths
People from the Nakhchivan Autonomous Republic
20th-century Azerbaijani painters